Wielgowo-Sławociesze is a municipal neighbourhood of the city of Szczecin, Poland situated on the right bank of Oder river, south-east of the Szczecin Old Town, and Middle Town. As of April 2011 it had a population of 3,741.

Wielgowo-Sławociesze comprises Wielgowo and Sławociesze.

References 

Neighbourhoods of Szczecin

pl:Wielgowo-Sławociesze